Asmoli is a village in Sambhal district of Uttar Pradesh state, India. It belongs to Moradabad Division. Asmoli is surrounded by Sambhal Tehsil towards South, Joya Tehsil towards North, Kundarki Tehsil towards East, Pawansa Tehsil towards South. Chandausi, Sambhal, Amroha, Moradabad are the nearby Cities to Asmoli.

Education

Primary school
Kishan Inter College
Kasturba Gandhi Balika Vidhyalaya
Rukmani Devi S.V.M.(JHS)
P.S Public School
Adarsh Inter College
Sarsavti Sisu Mandir School
Dr B. R. Ambedkar Public School
Vijay Kumar Junior Public School
S. P. Krishna Uttar Madyamic

College
Shree K.S Degree College
Roshan Singh Chauhan Smarak Mahavidyalaya,  Asmoli 
Durga Mahavidyalaya, Khaspur Lodhipur, Asmoli
Shaheen Smarak Mahavidyalaya, Manota, Chaudharpur Road,  Asmoli

References

http://www.empoweringindia.org/new/constituency.aspx?eid=754&cid=32

Villages in Sambhal district